Cyrnotheba corsica is a species of air-breathing, land snails, terrestrial pulmonate gastropod mollusks in the family Helicidae.

This species is endemic to France.

References

Cyrnotheba
Endemic molluscs of Metropolitan France
Gastropods described in 1843
Taxonomy articles created by Polbot